The 1990 NASCAR Winston Cup Series was the 42nd season of professional stock car racing in the United States and the 19th modern-era Cup Series. It began on Sunday, February 11, and ended on Sunday, November 18. Because of a highly controversial penalty to Mark Martin early in the season, Dale Earnhardt with Richard Childress Racing was crowned the Winston Cup champion for the fourth time, edging out Martin by 26 points.

Teams and drivers

Complete schedule

Limited schedule

Schedule

Races

Busch Clash 
The exhibition Busch Clash race, for drivers who have won a pole position in the previous season or have won the event before, was held on February 11 at Daytona International Speedway. Jimmy Hensley drew the pole.

Results

 25-Ken Schrader
 46-Greg Sacks
 28-Davey Allison
 11-Geoff Bodine
 9-Bill Elliott
 6-Mark Martin
 7-Alan Kulwicki
 27-Rusty Wallace
 15-Morgan Shepherd
 20-Jimmy Hensley

The No. 46 City Chevrolet of Sacks was entered for in-race footage for the 1990 film Days of Thunder.

Gatorade Twin 125s 
The Gatorade Twin 125s qualifying for the Daytona 500 was held on February 15 at Daytona International Speedway. 

Race One: Top Ten Results

 11-Geoff Bodine
 33-Harry Gant
 6-Mark Martin
 17-Darrell Waltrip
 43-Richard Petty
 14-A. J. Foyt
 25-Ken Schrader
 12-Mike Alexander
 98-Butch Miller
 5-Ricky Rudd

Race Two: Top Ten Results

 3-Dale Earnhardt
 9-Bill Elliott
 57-Jimmy Spencer
 4-Phil Parsons
 8-Bobby Hillin Jr.
 10-Derrike Cope
 83-Lake Speed
 28-Davey Allison
 90-Ernie Irvan
 1-Terry Labonte

On the final lap of the first race, Daytona 500 and Race #1 polesitter Ken Schrader was involved in a crash. The car was damaged beyond repair, and the team announced that they would start a back-up car on Sunday for the Daytona 500. However, he would have to move to the rear of the field. 
Two cars entered by Hendrick Motorsports (the No. 46 Superflo Chevrolet driven by Greg Sacks and the No. 51 Exxon Chevrolet driven by Bobby Hamilton) were entered into in-race footage for the 1990 film Days of Thunder. Both cars were unscored and withdrew from the race early.

Daytona 500 

The 32nd annual Daytona 500 was held on February 18 at Daytona International Speedway. Ken Schrader won the pole position. However, Schrader crashed his pole-winning car during the first of Thursday's Twin 125 qualifying races. Schrader moved to a backup car, and by rule, was moved to the rear of the field. Geoff Bodine (winner of the first Twin 125) slid up into the pole spot to start the race. It was announced that Schrader would still be eligible for the Unocal 76 Challenge, which at that point, had rolled over to $212,800.

Top Ten Results

 10-Derrike Cope
 1-Terry Labonte
 9-Bill Elliott
 5-Ricky Rudd
 3-Dale Earnhardt
 8-Bobby Hillin Jr.
 27-Rusty Wallace
 30-Michael Waltrip -1
 11-Geoff Bodine -1
 15-Morgan Shepherd -1

Failed to qualify: 0-Delma Cowart, 13-Mike Potter, 19-Chad Little, 29-Joe Booher, 34-Charlie Glotzbach, 35-Bill Venturini, 37-Dennis Langston, 39-Blackie Wangerin, 44-Jim Sauter, 48-Trevor Boys, 59-Mark Gibson, 70-J. D. McDuffie, 72-Stan Barrett, 77-Ken Ragan, 82-Mark Stahl, 85-Bobby Gerhart, 89-Rodney Combs, 96-Phillip Duffie, 01-Mickey Gibbs

Derrike Cope started off the 1990 season on a Cinderella note as he won his first ever Winston Cup race, the Daytona 500. It came when Dale Earnhardt, who had led 155 of 200 laps (at one point, leading by 25 seconds over 2nd place), ran over a piece of Rick Wilson's expired engine cutting a right rear tire in turn three on the final lap allowing Cope to shoot past for the win. Cope opted to not take a late pit stop and led briefly before relinquishing the lead in lap 196, not seeing the front again until the last lap. 
Two cars entered by Hendrick Motorsports (the No. 18 Hardee's Chevrolet driven by Tommy Ellis and the No. 51 Mello Yello Chevrolet driven by Bobby Hamilton) were entered for in-race footage for the 1990 film Days of Thunder. Both cars were unscored and withdrew from the race early.

Pontiac Excitement 400 
The Pontiac Excitement 400 was held on February 25 at Richmond International Raceway. Ricky Rudd won the pole.

Top Ten Results

 6-Mark Martin
 3-Dale Earnhardt
 5-Ricky Rudd
 9-Bill Elliott
 66-Dick Trickle
 27-Rusty Wallace
 15-Morgan Shepherd
 26-Brett Bodine
 57-Jimmy Spencer
 25-Ken Schrader

Failed to qualify: 70-J. D. McDuffie, 53-Jerry O'Neil

This was possibly the coldest race in NASCAR history, with a temperature in the mid-20s and winds gusting to 41 MPH, generating a wind chill of about 5 degrees.
Mark Martin won the race, only to lose 46 championship points after NASCAR officials discovered a somewhat oversized carburetor spacer plate in his car. This ultimately became a key factor in determining the 1990 championship. 
It was admitted later that the spacer plate was actually not oversized and not technically illegal. The part was bolted on instead of welded on, thus landing in the "gray area" of NASCAR rules. Dale Earnhardt and his car owner, Richard Childress, who finished second in the race, protested the result because of the findings of the post-race inspection. NASCAR eventually ruled that Martin and car owner Jack Roush would keep the victory, but would lose 46 points as a result of the infraction. This has spawned many years of speculation that NASCAR was biased toward Earnhardt, the eventual seven-time champion, but given that the race was only the second of the season (27 races still remained), nobody could have foreseen that the penalty would decide the points championship at the conclusion of the season.

GM Goodwrench 500 
The GM Goodwrench 500 was held on March 4, 1990, at North Carolina Motor Speedway. Kyle Petty won the pole.

Top Ten results

 42-Kyle Petty
 11-Geoff Bodine
 25-Ken Schrader -1
 94-Sterling Marlin -2
 27-Rusty Wallace -2
 17-Darrell Waltrip -3
 15-Morgan Shepherd -3
 57-Jimmy Spencer -3
 1-Terry Labonte -3
 3-Dale Earnhardt -3

This was Kyle Petty's first pole on his 277th start in the No. 42 Peak Pontiac owned by Felix Sabates and wrenched by crew chief Gary Nelson, later of NASCAR R&D. Petty dominated the race en route to victory, leading 433 of the 492 laps. Petty claimed the Unocal 76 Challenge, which had rolled over 29 times since it had last been won. Petty won a bonus of $228,400 in addition to the race purse, for an all-time NASCAR record (at the time) $284,450 single-race payday. Car owner Felix Sebates presented Petty with a Rolls-Royce as a gift for winning the elusive bonus.

Motorcraft Quality Parts 500 
The Motorcraft Quality Parts 500 was held on March 18 at Atlanta Motor Speedway. Dale Earnhardt won the pole.

Top Ten Results

 3-Dale Earnhardt
 15-Morgan Shepherd
 4-Ernie Irvan
 25-Ken Schrader
 6-Mark Martin
 42-Kyle Petty
 11-Geoff Bodine
 7-Alan Kulwicki -1
 33-Harry Gant -1
 94-Sterling Marlin -2

Failed to qualify: 14-A. J. Foyt, 46-Greg Sacks, 70-J. D. McDuffie

Dale enjoyed his first win since November 1989, which was also at Atlanta. Although he was suffering from an upset stomach, Earnhardt made up a lost lap to score a narrow victory over Morgan Shepherd. The race was virtually caution free as Earnhardt led 216 of 328 laps in recording a track record race average speed of 156.849 mph.
Ernie Irvan replaced Phil Parsons in the No. 4 Oldsmobile for Morgan-McClure Motorsports. This began a 3½ year tenure for Irvan in the No. 4.

TranSouth 500 
The TranSouth 500 was held on April 1 at Darlington Raceway. Geoff Bodine started on the pole.

Top Ten Results

 3-Dale Earnhardt
 6-Mark Martin
 28-Davey Allison
 11-Geoff Bodine
 15-Morgan Shepherd
 33-Harry Gant
 9-Bill Elliott
 26-Brett Bodine
 30-Michael Waltrip
 25-Ken Schrader -1

Failed to qualify:
48-Norm Benning, 74-Mike Potter, 82-Mark Stahl

Dale Earnhardt pulled away on two restarts in the final 18 laps and finished two car lengths in front of Mark Martin to earn his second victory of the 1990 season and second consecutive win at Darlington.
The race came under some controversy, as Ernie Irvan, who was ten laps down, was racing aggressively against then-leader Ken Schrader, lost control and started a huge crash that almost ended the career of Neil Bonnett. 
Two cars entered by Hendrick Motorsports (the No. 46 City Chevrolet driven by Greg Sacks and the No. 51 Exxon Chevrolet driven by Hut Stricklin) were originally for the 1990 film Days of Thunder, but were not used for in-race footage. Sacks started in 7th place, but finished in 37th due to a broken crankshaft. Stricklin started in 27th place but finished in 36th after withdrawing from the race.

Valleydale Meats 500 
The Valleydale Meats 500 was held on April 8 at Bristol International Raceway. The No. 4 of Ernie Irvan won the pole.

Top Ten Results

 28-Davey Allison
 6-Mark Martin
 5-Ricky Rudd
 1-Terry Labonte
 75-Rick Wilson
 25-Ken Schrader
 94-Sterling Marlin
 15-Morgan Shepherd -1
 17-Darrell Waltrip -1
 42-Kyle Petty -1

Failed to qualify:
19-Chad Little, 16-Larry Pearson

Michael Waltrip had a terrible crash in the previous day's Busch Series race when he hit the wall head on and his car collapsed into itself, but still managed to race in this race and finish 20th.
Davey Allison elected not to pit on the final caution on lap 391 while the other front runners took on fresh tires and fuel. The gamble paid off with Allison leading the rest of the way, holding off Mark Martin for the victory, by a margin of about 8 inches (one of the closest finishes in NASCAR history). Darrell Waltrip fell from contention with a cut tire with 25 laps left, leaving Allison, Martin, and Ricky Rudd in a bumper-to-bumper battle to the finish.
Sterling Marlin was spun out with half a lap to go by Rudd. This resulted in a physical confrontation inside Rudd's transporter after the race.  
Dale Jarrett was inserted into the No. 21 Ford for the Wood Brothers in a relief role (initially). It became permanent after Neil Bonnett developed a case of amnesia, which left him unable to race competitively.
The #33 Skoal "Bandit" Leo Jackson-owned Oldsmobile, normally driven by Harry Gant, was initially supposed to be driven by Rick Wilson after Gant skipped that race due to the death of his father, only for Wilson to give way to Phil Parsons for the actual race.

First Union 400 
The First Union 400 was held at North Wilkesboro Speedway on April 22, 1990. Mark Martin was the polesitter. Brett Bodine won his first and only Winston Cup race, and it was the final victory for Buick in NASCAR.

Top Ten Results

 26-Brett Bodine
 17-Darrell Waltrip
 3-Dale Earnhardt
 5-Ricky Rudd
 15-Morgan Shepherd
 6-Mark Martin
 27-Rusty Wallace
 11-Geoff Bodine
 28-Davey Allison
 42-Kyle Petty -1

Failed to qualify:
48-Freddie Crawford, 70-J. D. McDuffie, 76-Bill Sedgwick

Controversy erupted after Kenny Wallace, who was making his first start in the series, crashed in turn one and brought out a caution on lap 320. During the yellow, the pace car erroneously picked up Dale Earnhardt as the leader, instead of Brett Bodine. This led to much confusion as to who was leading the race (NASCAR did not have electronic timing and scoring until 1993). Bodine had been waved around and was at the tail end of the line of cars, ostensibly the true race leader. Bodine's team was in fact in executing an "undercut" strategy (somewhat unfamiliar at the time), having pitted earlier on the previous stint (in order to gain track position with newer tires). With Bodine momentarily at the tail end of the line, the King Racing crew brought him into the pits for fresh tires. Back out on the track, it took 17 caution laps to sort out the scoring error. Ultimately, the field was waved by until Bodine was the first car behind the pace car as the true leader. With the added advantage of fresh tires, Bodine cruised to victory. After the race, Darrell Waltrip, who finished second, protested the victory; however, it was turned down on the grounds that the decision to put Bodine in the lead was a judgment call that was unappealable under NASCAR rules.

Hanes Activewear 500 
The Hanes Activewear 500 was held on April 29 at Martinsville Speedway. Geoff Bodine won the pole.

Top Ten Results

 11-Geoff Bodine
 27-Rusty Wallace
 15-Morgan Shepherd
 17-Darrell Waltrip
 3-Dale Earnhardt -1
 25-Ken Schrader -2
 6-Mark Martin -2
 30-Michael Waltrip -3
 66-Dick Trickle -3
 9-Bill Elliott -3

Failed to qualify: none

Geoff lost the lead on the first lap but held the lead four times during the race including the final 137 laps for his first win of the season at Martinsville. In an afternoon-long battle of the pit crews with Rusty Wallace, Bodine's crew executed a four-tire change in 19.6 seconds during the 10th and final caution period to beat Wallace back onto the track on lap 364 and easily cruised to the checkered flag.

Winston 500 
The Winston 500 was held on May 6 at Talladega Superspeedway. The No. 9 of Bill Elliott won the pole.*

Top Ten Results

 3-Dale Earnhardt
 18-Greg Sacks
 6-Mark Martin
 4-Ernie Irvan
 30-Michael Waltrip
 1-Terry Labonte
 42-Kyle Petty -1
 15-Morgan Shepherd -1
 12-Hut Stricklin -1
 17-Darrell Waltrip -1

Failed to qualify: 70-J. D. McDuffie, 80-Jimmy Horton, 82-Mark Stahl, 85-Bobby Gerhart

Bill Elliott's pole speed of 199.388 mph (48.027 seconds) is the fastest qualifying lap turned in the Winston Cup Series since restrictor plates began to be used at Daytona and Talladega.
Dale Earnhardt dominated the field to lead eight times for 107 of 188 laps to earn his third win of the season. Drafting with one other driver after the sixth of seven cautions, the field was left behind when the final caution ended on the 172nd lap and Dale sped to victory.
An ESPN on-board camera caught footage of Dick Trickle smoking in his car during a caution period.

Winston Open 
The Winston Open, a shootout race for drivers who are normally not eligible for The Winston, was held May 20 at Charlotte Motor Speedway with the winner transferring to The Winston later in the day. Ernie Irvan was on the pole.

Top Ten Results

 66-Dick Trickle
 20-Rob Moroso
 4-Ernie Irvan
 94-Sterling Marlin
 12-Hut Stricklin
 75-Rick Wilson
 43-Richard Petty
 71-Dave Marcis
 16-Larry Pearson
 98-Butch Miller

The Winston 
The Winston was held May 20 at Charlotte Motor Speedway. Dale Earnhardt started on the pole.

Top Ten Results

 3-Dale Earnhardt
 25-Ken Schrader
 6-Mark Martin
 9-Bill Elliott
 28-Davey Allison
 66-Dick Trickle (Winston Open Winner)
 33-Harry Gant
 7-Alan Kulwicki
 15-Morgan Shepherd
 8-Bobby Hillin Jr.

Dale Earnhardt continued his early-season domination of the Winston Cup circuit with a runaway victory in the annual All-Star event. The 1990 edition was the 6th annual running of The Winston & the second victory in the "winners-only" event for Earnhardt and Richard Childress Racing. Earnhardt led all 70 laps after starting from the pole position & won $325,000. Earnhardt became the first 2-time winner of the race.

Coca-Cola 600 
The Coca-Cola 600 was held May 27 at Charlotte Motor Speedway. The No. 25 of Ken Schrader won the pole.

Top Ten Results

 27-Rusty Wallace
 9-Bill Elliott
 6-Mark Martin
 30-Michael Waltrip
 4-Ernie Irvan
 7-Alan Kulwicki
 28-Davey Allison
 15-Morgan Shepherd
 10-Derrike Cope
 11-Geoff Bodine

Failed to qualify:
0-Delma Cowart, 35-Bill Venturini, 36-H. B. Bailey, 38-Dick Johnson, 52-Jimmy Means, 53-Jerry O'Neil, 70-J. D. McDuffie, 74-Mike Potter, 82-Mark Stahl, 01-Mickey Gibbs, 04-Bill Meacham, 48-Robin Best

Rusty Wallace emerged from early season mediocrity to announce his return to dominance with a shootout win over Bill Elliott. Wallace led 306 of the 400 laps for his first win of the season, resuming his final lead on lap 310 when Geoff Bodine made a green-flag pit stop. A two-lap caution beginning on lap 297 set up the duel between Wallace and Elliott, who had regained a lap he lost early in the race. 
This was Rusty Wallace's only career win in a crown jewel event (other crown jewel events are the Daytona 500, Winston 500, and Southern 500).

Budweiser 500 

The Budweiser 500 was held at Dover Downs International Speedway on June 3, 1990. Dick Trickle won the pole.

Top Ten Results

 10-Derrike Cope
 25-Ken Schrader
 66-Dick Trickle
 6-Mark Martin
 94-Sterling Marlin
 15-Morgan Shepherd
 4-Ernie Irvan
 9-Bill Elliott
 42-Kyle Petty
 27-Rusty Wallace

Footage from this race was used in the ESPN Home Video Racing Tough, hosted by Benny Parsons and Brett Bodine.
Dale Earnhardt had blown the engine early in the race. Earnhardt's crew performed the unheard-of feat of actually fixing a blown engine and getting the car back on the track. Unfortunately, he blew his engine again later in the race.
This was Derrike Cope's 2nd and last Winston Cup win.
As a result of both his consistency (with 11 Top 10 finishes) and Earnhardt's engine problems, Morgan Shepherd would briefly assume the points lead for the only time in his career.

Banquet Frozen Foods 300 

The Banquet Frozen Foods 300 was held June 10 at Sears Point Raceway. Ricky Rudd won the pole.

Top Ten Results

 27-Rusty Wallace
 6-Mark Martin
 5-Ricky Rudd
 11-Geoff Bodine
 8-Bobby Hillin Jr.
 94-Sterling Marlin
 4-Ernie Irvan
 0-Irv Hoerr*
 30-Michael Waltrip
 75-Rick Wilson

Failed to qualify: 52-Jimmy Means, J. C. Danielson, St. James Davis, Mike Hickingbottom

Rusty Wallace continued his Winston Cup road course mastery in earning his second win of the season at Sears Point. It was his fifth road course win in the last seven, finishing second in the other two. Wallace overtook Ricky Rudd on the 11th turn on lap 60 and led the rest of the way, beating Mark Martin to the caution on lap 73, earning the win under caution in the final lap. Martin overtook the Winston Cup points race at 1800.
This was the final race victory for Blue Max Racing as the team would fold after Wallace left the team at the end of 1990, Roger Penske would acquire their equipment and hire Wallace starting in 1991.
Irv Hoerr was a road course ringer racing for Richard Jackson Motorsports. His car was a Skoal Classic Oldsmobile in colors very similar to Terry Labonte's.
After finishing 29th due to a blown engine, the first time all season finishing outside the Top 10, Morgan Shepherd lost his points lead to Mark Martin.
Final Top 5 finish for Bobby Hillin Jr.

Miller Genuine Draft 500 

The Miller Genuine Draft 500 was held at Pocono International Raceway on June 17, 1990. Ernie Irvan started on the pole.

Top Ten Results

 33-Harry Gant
 27-Rusty Wallace
 11-Geoff Bodine
 26-Brett Bodine
 28-Davey Allison
 12-Hut Stricklin
 18-Greg Sacks
 17-Darrell Waltrip
 94-Sterling Marlin
 42-Kyle Petty

Failed to qualify: 74-John Linville

This race set a record (at the time) for the most cars finishing on the lead lap, with 22 cars completing all 500 miles.

Miller Genuine Draft 400 

The Miller Genuine Draft 400 was held at Michigan International Speedway on June 24, 1990. Mark Martin won the pole via points as qualifying was rained out.

Top Ten Results

 3-Dale Earnhardt
 4-Ernie Irvan
 11-Geoff Bodine
 6-Mark Martin
 33-Harry Gant
 7-Alan Kulwicki
 1-Terry Labonte
 42-Kyle Petty
 5-Ricky Rudd
 75-Rick Wilson

Failed to qualify: 50-Rich Vogler, 77-Ken Ragan, 34-Charlie Glotzbach

Bill Elliott led 102 laps and had the car to beat, but blew an engine on lap 185.

Pepsi 400 

The Pepsi 400 was held at Daytona International Speedway on July 7, 1990. Greg Sacks won the pole.

Top Ten Results

 3-Dale Earnhardt
 7-Alan Kulwicki
 25-Ken Schrader
 1-Terry Labonte
 94-Sterling Marlin
 8-Bobby Hillin Jr.
 33-Harry Gant
 21-Dale Jarrett
 20-Rob Moroso
 42-Kyle Petty -1

Failed to qualify: 70-J. D. McDuffie*, 72-Tracy Leslie, 80-Jimmy Horton*

During practice Darrell Waltrip suffered serious injuries (multiple leg fractures, a broken arm, 9 broken ribs, a concussion) in a multi-car practice crash that was caused by a broken oil line in A. J. Foyt's No. 14 Oldsmobile car that Dale Earnhardt happened to be driving at the time (Foyt had Indycar commitments, and Earnhardt had promised to shake the car down in final practice). During the wreck, Waltrip's No. 17 Chevrolet spun out and stopped in the middle of the track with its left side facing traffic. Before he could get the car restarted, Waltrip was T-Boned by the No. 71 of Dave Marcis in the driver's door. Waltrip's injuries forced him to miss 6 races.  Marcis suffered a broken leg and had to borrow J. D. McDuffie's Pontiac to start the race. McDuffie relieved him after the pace lap.
Jimmy Horton, who had failed to qualify for the race, was tapped to fill in for Waltrip at Daytona and was Waltrip's relief driver 2 weeks later at Pocono.
As a result of Waltrip's crash, NASCAR thoroughly inspected Waltrip's car.  Waltrip describes in his book, DW: A Lifetime Going Around in Circles, that the engine had a "floating block in the manifold that sat under the restrictor plate."  This was not necessarily illegal, but it was not approved by NASCAR. NASCAR forced Hendrick Motorsports (including the pole sitting No. 18 Chevrolet of Greg Sacks) and other teams to weld the blocks into proper place.  This, along with his team's forgetting to put the car's spoiler back into its proper position after qualifying, resulted in the pole sitting car of Sacks essentially being a sitting duck, which more or less caused The Big One at the end of the 1st lap, which involved 24 cars and took 11 cars immediately out of the race.
Dale Earnhardt dominated the race and led 127 laps on his first Winston Cup points race win at Daytona
Shortly after the race, Earnhardt, Terry Labonte, Mark Martin, and Rusty Wallace all departed for Cleveland to compete in an IROC race that same afternoon.
This race would mark Rob Moroso's only Top 10 finish in a points-paying race, as he was the last car on the lead lap in 9th place.

AC Spark Plug 500 
The AC Spark Plug 500 was held July 22 at Pocono Raceway. Mark Martin qualified on the top spot.

Top Ten Results

 11-Geoff Bodine
 9-Bill Elliott
 27-Rusty Wallace
 3-Dale Earnhardt
 28-Davey Allison
 6-Mark Martin
 5-Ricky Rudd
 98-Butch Miller
 43-Richard Petty
 1-Terry Labonte

Did not start: 50-Rich Vogler (credited with 40th-place finish)

Failed to qualify: 2-Troy Beebe, 70-J. D. McDuffie, 85-Bobby Gerhart

Rich Vogler was set to make his Winston Cup debut at this event as he had qualified 32nd for this race, but on the night before, he was killed in a sprint car race at Salem Speedway.
Junior Johnson's team gambled on the amount of fuel in Geoff Bodine's tank and elected not to make a pit stop as Bodine nearly coasted to victory over Bill Elliott at Pocono. Bodine led nine times for 119 of the 200 laps. Elliott had pitted on lap 157 and needed no fuel for the finish while other contenders made fuel stops beginning with 11 laps left. After a four-lap caution, the race was restarted on the final lap and Bodine finished with a half-gallon to spare. Martin won the pole. One car that qualified for this race did not roll off the grid.
Darrell Waltrip actually started the race in the No. 17, and pulled in to put Jimmy Horton in the car at the end of the 1st lap.  NASCAR official Dick Beaty stated the day before that he wanted Darrell to stay at the back of the field, do not pass anybody, and pull in at the end of the 1st lap for the driver change.  Waltrip passed 3 or 4 cars at the start, then caught a caution that allowed him to do the driver change under yellow.  Beaty then penalized the No. 17 1 lap for disobeying the earlier command (as stated in Waltrip's book, DW: A Lifetime Going Around in Circles).

DieHard 500 
The DieHard 500 was held July 29, 1990, at Talladega Superspeedway. Dale Earnhardt won the pole.

Top Ten Results

 3-Dale Earnhardt
 9-Bill Elliott
 94-Sterling Marlin
 7-Alan Kulwicki
 5-Ricky Rudd
 4-Ernie Irvan
 10-Derrike Cope
 42-Kyle Petty
 6-Mark Martin
 8-Bobby Hillin Jr. -1

Failed to qualify: 0-Delma Cowart, 70-J. D. McDuffie, 77-Ken Ragan

Dale Earnhardt made it three of four major superspeedway titles so far in the 1990 season by winning the pole, leading a record-breaking 134 laps and winning the race. Earnhardt got the win by dropping behind another driver to draft and conserve fuel on lap 151, then passing him on turn four with 20 laps left, and leading the rest of the way to the checkered flag. As of 2022, this marks the only time in NASCAR history that a driver won 3 straight restrictor plate races.
Amateur driver Stanley Smith was involved in a pit road mishap when he lost control of his car and hit several crew members for Tracy Leslie's team. No one was seriously injured.
As the leaders came off turn 4 on the last lap, the caution was waved along with the checkered flag. No reason for the caution was ever given by the CBS announcers after the race, although photographs have shown that the No. 57 of Jimmy Spencer actually rolled over on the last lap of the race and managed to still finish 24th, 2 laps down.

Budweiser at The Glen 

The Budweiser at The Glen was held at Watkins Glen International on August 12, 1990. Dale Earnhardt won the pole.

Top Ten Results

 5-Ricky Rudd
 11-Geoff Bodine
 26-Brett Bodine
 30-Michael Waltrip
 6-Mark Martin
 15-Morgan Shepherd
 3-Dale Earnhardt
 40-Tommy Kendall
 25-Ken Schrader
 0-Irv Hoerr

Failed to qualify:   93-Troy Beebe

After finishing the race in 11th, the No. 7 of Alan Kulwicki actually caught fire, forcing Alan to bail out just past the start-finish line.
Originally, Rick Hendrick was scheduled to race the event - however, sports car racer Sarel van der Merwe substituted for Darrell Waltrip in the No. 17. He finished in 24th place after crashing late in the race. At the time, van der Merwe was racing for Rick Hendrick's Camel GT team in IMSA.
First career start for Rick Ware who later became a NASCAR Cup Series team owner.

Champion Spark Plug 400 
The Champion Spark Plug 400 was held on August 19, 1990, at Michigan International Speedway. The No. 7 of Alan Kulwicki won the pole.

Top Ten Results
 6-Mark Martin
 17-Greg Sacks
 27-Rusty Wallace
 9-Bill Elliott
 5-Ricky Rudd
 28-Davey Allison
 11-Geoff Bodine
 3-Dale Earnhardt
 15-Morgan Shepherd
 21-Dale Jarrett

Failed to qualify: 34-Charlie Glotzbach, 36-H. B. Bailey, 70-J. D. McDuffie, 72-Tracy Leslie

Mark Martin started on the outside of the front row, hovered in the top five the first half of the race, then demonstrated his dominance by leading 70 of the last 100 laps to win at Michigan. Martin and Rusty Wallace linked up for a side-by-side duel on lap 124 with Martin emerging ahead never to be challenged again. He regained the lead on lap 162 after a flurry of green-flag pit stops and led the rest of the 200 laps.

Busch 500 
The Busch 500 was held August 25, 1990, at Bristol International Raceway. Dale Earnhardt won the pole.

Top Ten Results

 4-Ernie Irvan
 27-Rusty Wallace
 6-Mark Martin
 1-Terry Labonte
 94-Sterling Marlin
 7-Alan Kulwicki
 21-Dale Jarrett -1
 3-Dale Earnhardt -1
 30-Michael Waltrip -1
 5-Ricky Rudd -1

Failed to qualify: 19-Chad Little, 70-J. D. McDuffie, 74-Mike Potter

Ernie Irvan and the Morgan-McClure Motorsports team captured their first ever Winston Cup victory at Bristol. The last 50 laps of the 500-lap race was a shootout between Irvan and Rusty Wallace. Irvan never relinquished the lead to Wallace, which he gained on lap 411. Irvan finished one car length ahead of Wallace.

Heinz Southern 500 
The Heinz Southern 500 was held on September 2, 1990, at Darlington Raceway. Dale Earnhardt won the pole.

Top Ten Results

 3-Dale Earnhardt
 4-Ernie Irvan
 7-Alan Kulwicki
 9-Bill Elliott
 33-Harry Gant
 6-Mark Martin
 5-Ricky Rudd
 11-Geoff Bodine
 10-Derrike Cope -1
 26-Brett Bodine -1

Failed to qualify:
70-J. D. McDuffie

The traditional Labor Day event saw Dale Earnhardt capture the Richard Childress Racing's fourth pole of the season before winning the race. Even with an ill-handling racecar, Earnhardt recovered, made up a lost lap and then having to battle a vibrating tire to outrun Ernie Irvan to the checkered flag. With the $200,000 payday ($100,000 of this was a bonus from Winston for winning 2 out of 4 crown jewel races in a season), Dale became the first race car driver in history to pass the $11,000,000 mark in career winnings.
This was the final time Dale Earnhardt won from the pole.
During the race, Morgan Shepherd and Ken Schrader made contact, sending Schrader into the wall. An angry Schrader returned to the race and rammed Shepherd into the wall, knocking both drivers out of the race.

Miller Genuine Draft 400 

The Miller Genuine Draft 400 was held September 9, 1990, at Richmond International Raceway. Ernie Irvan won the pole.

 Top Ten Results

 3-Dale Earnhardt
 6-Mark Martin
 17-Darrell Waltrip*
 9-Bill Elliott
 27-Rusty Wallace
 42-Kyle Petty
 66-Dick Trickle
 5-Ricky Rudd -1
 11-Geoff Bodine -1
 25-Ken Schrader -1

Failed to qualify: 70-J. D. McDuffie, 47-Jack Pennington, 13-Kerry Teague

 This would be the final day race at Richmond that would be run during the fall.
Dale Earnhardt won his fifth of the last nine races, gambling on his fuel mileage to lead the last 25 laps of the race. As the car coasted toward victory lane, it ran out of gas. "We figured our only chance was to win it on gas mileage and we did," said Dale. "I nursed it as much as I could for the last twenty laps and it was sputtering when I took the checkered flag. Luckily we made the right decision." 
This was Darrell Waltrip's first full race back from his injuries suffered at Daytona in July.

Peak AntiFreeze 500 

The Peak AntiFreeze 500 was held at Dover Downs International Speedway on September 16, 1990. Bill Elliott won the pole

Top Ten Results

 9-Bill Elliott
 6-Mark Martin
 3-Dale Earnhardt
 33-Harry Gant -1
 30-Michael Waltrip -1
 21-Dale Jarrett -1
 27-Rusty Wallace -1
 42-Kyle Petty -1
 28-Davey Allison -1
 25-Ken Schrader -2

Failed to qualify: 13-Kerry Teague

Elliott dominated the race leading 364 laps of the 500 lap race.

Goody's 500 

The Goody's 500 was held at Martinsville Speedway on September 23, 1990. Mark Martin won the pole.

Top ten results

 11-Geoff Bodine
 3-Dale Earnhardt
 6-Mark Martin
 26-Brett Bodine
 33-Harry Gant
 7-Alan Kulwicki
 28-Davey Allison
 9-Bill Elliott
 1-Terry Labonte -2
 21-Dale Jarrett -3

Failed to qualify: 2–Ron Esau, 70–J. D. McDuffie

Geoff Bodine swept the races at Martinsville in 1990.

Tyson Holly Farms 400 
The Tyson Holly Farms 400 was held September 30, 1990, at North Wilkesboro Speedway. Kyle Petty won the pole.

Top Ten Results

 6-Mark Martin
 3-Dale Earnhardt
 26-Brett Bodine
 9-Bill Elliott
 25-Ken Schrader
 4-Ernie Irvan
 17-Darrell Waltrip
 27-Rusty Wallace
 7-Alan Kulwicki
 42-Kyle Petty -1

Failed to qualify:
2-Ron Esau, 40-Tommy Kendall, 41-Larry Pearson, 47-Jack Pennington, 70-J. D. McDuffie

Dale Earnhardt dominated, leading 291 of 400 laps, but Mark Martin snatched the lead on lap 363, and held onto it until the finish.
With the win, Martin retained his 16-point advantage in the Winston Cup Championship race. Two pit stops to remove spring rubber left him in 12th place on lap 196, but by lap 288 he was in second place. On lap 263, Martin was the only driver to pass Earnhardt under green.
The race was marked by tragedy, as rookie driver Rob Moroso, who finished in 21st place in this race, was killed in a highway accident hours after this race had concluded. Police reports said that Moroso was above the legal alcohol limit when he crashed.

Mello Yello 500 

The Mello Yello 500 was held on October 7, 1990, at Charlotte Motor Speedway. Brett Bodine won the pole.

Top Ten Results

 28-Davey Allison
 15-Morgan Shepherd
 30-Michael Waltrip
 42-Kyle Petty
 7-Alan Kulwicki
 5-Ricky Rudd
 10-Derrike Cope
 26-Brett Bodine
 17-Darrell Waltrip
 21-Dale Jarrett -1

Failed to qualify: 13-Mike Skinner, 65-Dave Mader III, 89-Rodney Combs, 64-Gary Wright, 40-Tommy Kendall, 13-Kerry Teague, 70-J. D. McDuffie, 74-Mike Potter, 93-Troy Beebe, 72-Tracy Leslie, 53-Jerry O'Neil, 36-H. B. Bailey, 54-Bob Schacht, 0-Delma Cowart, 04-Bill Meacham, 35-Bill Venturini.

It seemed that Bill Elliott had the dominant car but blew the engine on lap 331 of 334 after leading 243 laps regulating him to a 15th-place finish.
During a caution, Dale Earnhardt, who was not running well, lost all four tires at the end of pit road after a pit stop (communication mix-up, lug nuts). His crew ran down pit lane with jacks and got him back on all fours but he lost a few laps. Mark Martin had a chance to capitalize on the misfortune but ended up losing a cylinder and finished 14th, 3 laps down.

AC Delco 500 
The AC Delco 500 was held October 21, 1990, at North Carolina Speedway. Ken Schrader won the pole.

Top Ten Results
 7-Alan Kulwicki
 9-Bill Elliott
 33-Harry Gant
 11-Geoff Bodine
 25-Ken Schrader
 94-Sterling Marlin -1
 5-Ricky Rudd -1
 17-Darrell Waltrip -1
 4-Ernie Irvan -2
 3-Dale Earnhardt -2

Failed to qualify: 0-Delma Cowart, 48-James Hylton, 70-J. D. McDuffie, 82-Mark Stahl

Alan Kulwicki led six times for 155 of 492 laps, including the last 55 after taking the lead from Bill Elliott, to post his first win since November 1988 at Phoenix International Raceway. The race ended under caution.
With both finishing three laps back, the Richard Childress Racing team gained five points on Mark Martin in the Winston Cup Championship race, though Martin still held a 45-point lead with two races remaining. 
During the last caution, Ken Schrader pitted for 4 tires on the final lap, dropping him from 4th to 5th place.

Checker 500 

The Checker 500 was held November 4, 1990, at Phoenix International Raceway. Rusty Wallace won the pole.

Top Ten Results

 3-Dale Earnhardt
 25-Ken Schrader
 15-Morgan Shepherd
 17-Darrell Waltrip
 9-Bill Elliott
 7-Alan Kulwicki
 98-Rick Mast
 11-Geoff Bodine
 4-Ernie Irvan
 6-Mark Martin

Failed to qualify:
04-Hershel McGriff, 34-Ted Kennedy, 24-Butch Gilliland, 61-Rick Scribner, 44-Jack Sellers, 22-St. James Davis

Dale Earnhardt won his first (and only) race at Phoenix in a dominant way leading the most laps (262 laps of 312). He also took the points lead by 6 points over Mark Martin heading into the season finale at Atlanta.
This was the first season since 1987 where Dale Earnhardt won the most races in a season. 1990 was also the final season in his career that he won the most races in a season.

Atlanta Journal 500 
The final race of the season was held on November 18, 1990, at Atlanta Motor Speedway. Rusty Wallace won the pole.

Top Ten Results

 15-Morgan Shepherd
 11-Geoff Bodine
 3-Dale Earnhardt
 21-Dale Jarrett
 17-Darrell Waltrip
 6-Mark Martin
 4-Ernie Irvan
 7-Alan Kulwicki
 27-Rusty Wallace
 18-Greg Sacks -1

Failed to qualify: 82-Mark Stahl

Tragedy struck during the race when Ricky Rudd driving the Levi Garrett No. 5 locked his brakes up, lost control of the car on pit road, and struck and killed Mike Ritch, a pit crew member on Bill Elliott's team.
The fatal accident on pit road was the trigger for a series of new pit road procedures in the Winston Cup Series. At this time, pit road had no speed limit, which meant that cars would blast down pit road in order to lose a least amount of time. Drivers were essentially waved into their pit stall by a sign board man who would stand out in pit lane holding up their team's pit board. (Examples of this can be seen in the film Days of Thunder.) In addition, pit road was not closed when the caution was first displayed, which would result in cars rushing into the pits before the pace car picked up the field. This was first curtailed by the banning of tire changes under caution, an extremely unpopular move (all other services were still allowed though). The pit road closing procedures (that continue today in a modified form) also began with this pit procedure. New rules for pit crews that required crews to stay on the other side of the pit wall from the cars until their car was one stall away were instituted.
Pit board men were no longer allowed to stand out in the middle of the pit lane. Lollipops, similar to what is used in most motorsport, were dangled out in the pit stall from the other side of the pit wall. In addition, each car was issued either a blue (with a white number 1 on it) or orange sticker (with a white number 2 on it). The odd numbered cars got the blue stickers while the even numbered cars got the orange stickers. Once the green flag came back out, the blue flag was put out at the end of the second lap after the restart, which allowed only the odd-numbered cars to pit for tires. At the end of the third lap after the restart, an orange flag was displayed, allowing only even-numbered cars to pit for tires. This procedure only lasted a few races before it was dumped in favor of pit road speed limits.
This was the final time Darrell Waltrip drove for Hendrick Motorsports, as he left following this race to form his own team with sponsorship from Western Auto for 1991. Also, Darrell would not drive for another car owner until 1998 when he filled in for an injured Steve Park at Dale Earnhardt, Inc.

Full Drivers' Championship

(key) Bold – Pole position awarded by time. Italics – Pole position set by owner's points. * – Most laps led.

Rookie of the Year

The 1990 season was a slim season for Rookie of the Year contenders. 1989 Busch Series champion Rob Moroso had a top-ten finish and qualified for every race, but he was killed in a car crash before the end of the year and was awarded the top rookie award posthumously. His top runner-up was Jack Pennington, a late-model dirt racing champion, who had 14 starts and no top-tens in an unsponsored car. The only other declarees were Jerry O'Neil and Jeff Purvis, who did not run enough races to be completely eligible for the honor.

See also
1990 NASCAR Busch Series

References

External links 
 Winston Cup Standings and Statistics for 1990
Race Summaries are from Maxx Trading Card's 1990 NASCAR set.
Non-qualifiers taken from contemporary reports in Grand National Scene magazine.

 
NASCAR Cup Series seasons
1990 in sports in California